Crunchyroll is an American subscription video on-demand over-the-top streaming service owned by Sony Group Corporation through a joint venture between Sony Pictures and Sony Music Entertainment Japan's Aniplex. The service primarily distributes films and television series produced by East Asian media, including Japanese anime.

Founded in 2006 by a group of University of California, Berkeley, graduates, Crunchyroll's distribution channel and partnership program delivers content to over 100million registered users worldwide. Crunchyroll was a subsidiary of AT&T's Otter Media, and from 2016 to 2018, the company partnered with Funimation, which would eventually merge into its brand in 2022 after Sony acquired Crunchyroll in 2021. 

Crunchyroll has offices in San Francisco, Culver City, Dallas, New York City, Melbourne, Tokyo, Paris, Roubaix, Berlin, Chișinău, Lausanne, and London, and is a member of The Association of Japanese Animations (AJA). "Crunchyroll-Hime", also known as "Hime", is the official mascot of Crunchyroll.

Crunchyroll offers over 1,000 anime shows, more than 200 East Asian dramas to users, and around 80 manga titles as Crunchyroll Manga, although not all programming is available worldwide due to licensing restrictions. Crunchyroll passed one million paid subscribers in February 2017, and has over 10million paid subscribers . Crunchyroll also releases titles on home video either directly or by having select anime titles released through its distribution partners (Sentai Filmworks, Viz Media, Discotek Media, and its corporate sibling, Aniplex of America in North America; Anime Limited in the United Kingdom).

History

Origins and informal distribution

Crunchyroll started in 2006 as a for-profit video upload and streaming site that specialized in hosting East Asian content. Some of the content hosted on Crunchyroll included versions of East Asian shows that had been subtitled by fans.

In 2008, Crunchyroll secured a capital investment of $4.05 million from the venture capital firm Venrock. The investment drew criticism from anime distributors and licensors Bandai Entertainment and Funimation, as the site continued to allow users to upload unlicensed copies of copyrighted titles.

Move to legal distribution
Crunchyroll eventually began securing legal distribution agreements with companies, including Gonzo, for a growing list of titles. On January 8, 2009, after announcing a deal with TV Tokyo to host episodes of Naruto Shippuden, Crunchyroll stated that it was committed to removing all copyright-infringing material from its site and to hosting only content to which it had legitimate distribution rights.

In 2010, Crunchyroll announced its acquisition of the North American DVD rights to 5 Centimeters Per Second. This was the first DVD release licensed by Crunchyroll.

On October 30, 2013, Crunchyroll began digitally distributing 12 different manga titles from Kodansha – series such as Attack on Titan and Fairy Tail were part of the manga that were available initially – through Crunchyroll Manga.

Chernin Group ownership
On December 2, 2013, The Chernin Group, former News Corp. president Peter Chernin's holding company, announced that it acquired a controlling interest in Crunchyroll for a reported $100 million. The Chernin Group said that Crunchyroll management and existing investor TV Tokyo would maintain a "significant" stake in the company.

On April 22, 2014, AT&T and The Chernin Group announced the formation of a joint venture to acquire, invest in and launch over-the-top (OTT) video services. Both companies committed over $500 million in funding to the venture. The new company was named Otter Media and became the majority owner of Crunchyroll. On August 3, 2015, Variety reported that Otter Media would unveil Ellation, a new umbrella company for its subscription-based video services including Crunchyroll. Ellation's services included VRV, which debuted in 2016, a video streaming platform described as targeting "geeks, gamers and lovers of comedy, fantasy and technology."

On October 22, 2015, Anime News Network reported that Crunchyroll had achieved 700,000 paying subscribers. In addition, the company announced that Crunchyroll and Sumitomo Corporation had created a joint venture to produce and invest in anime productions.

On April 11, 2016, Crunchyroll and Kadokawa Corporation announced the formation of a strategic alliance that gave Crunchyroll exclusive worldwide digital distribution rights (excluding Asia) for Kadokawa anime titles in the upcoming year. It also granted Crunchyroll the right to co-finance Kadokawa anime titles to be produced in the future.

Funimation partnership, and home video expansion
On July 1, 2016, Crunchyroll announced plans to dub and release a number of series on home video.

On September 8, 2016, Crunchyroll announced a partnership with Funimation. Crunchyroll would stream select Funimation titles, while Funimation would stream select Crunchyroll titles, as well as their upcoming dubbed content. In addition, Funimation would act as the distributor for Crunchyroll's home video catalog.

On February 9, 2017, Crunchyroll announced that it had reached one million paid subscribers.

On March 22, 2017, Kun Gao took over as representative director of its Japanese branch, succeeding Vincent Shortino.

On March 30, 2017, Crunchyroll began to distribute anime through Steam.

On November 4, 2017, a group of hackers managed to hijack the official site for almost six hours. Users were redirected to a fake lookalike site which prompted users to download ransomware under the guise of "CrunchyViewer". Crunchyroll filed a first information report against the hackers.

AT&T/WarnerMedia ownership and internal productions
In January 2018, Otter Media bought the remaining shares (20%) of Crunchyroll from TV Tokyo and other investors. In August 2018, AT&T acquired the remainder of Otter Media that it did not already own from Chernin Group; the company and Crunchyroll were thus folded under WarnerMedia (formerly Time Warner, of which AT&T had also recently completed an acquisition).

In August 2018, the service announced an expansion into original content with the anime-inspired series High Guardian Spice produced by Ellation Studios.

On October 18, 2018, Funimation announced that their partnership with Crunchyroll ended as a result of Sony Pictures Television's acquisition of Funimation and AT&T's acquisition of Crunchyroll's parent company Otter Media. 

On March 4, 2019, it was announced that Otter Media would be placed under Warner Bros. as part of a reorganization. As a result of said reorganization, the company and Crunchyroll became corporate sisters to the American cable channel Cartoon Network and its nighttime programming block Adult Swim, which have been known for their television broadcasting of most of its anime under their Toonami brand. Due to a subsequent reorganization, Crunchyroll was moved under WarnerMedia Entertainment (owner of networks such as TBS and TNT) in May 2019, so that its COO could oversee an upcoming entertainment streaming service from the brand.

On July 3, 2019, Crunchyroll announced that they had partnered with Viz Media to distribute select Crunchyroll licensed titles on home video and electronic sell-through in the United States and Canada.

On July 20, 2019, independent Australian production company Glitch Productions announced that they had partnered with Crunchyroll to produce their YouTube original series, Meta Runner.

On September 6, 2019, Crunchyroll announced that they became the majority investor in Viz Media Europe. Crunchyroll solidified this deal on December 4, 2019, becoming the majority owners of Viz Media Europe Group, and appointed former Viz Media Europe president John Easum as Head of Crunchyroll EMEA.

On October 15, 2019, it was announced that Naver Corporation's webtoon publishing portal, WEBTOON, was partnering with Crunchyroll to produce animated adaptations of its series. On February 25, 2020, Crunchyroll announced a slate of several programs under their new "Crunchyroll Originals" brand, including anime adaptations of the webtoons Tower of God, The God of High School, and Noblesse.

On April 2, 2020, Crunchyroll announced it had rebranded Viz Media Europe as Crunchyroll EMEA, with former Viz Media Europe brands Kazé, Anime on Demand, Anime Digital Network and Eye See Movies becoming Crunchyroll brands, and AV Visionen and Ellation becoming Crunchyroll companies. As a result of the rebranding, the Ellation name transitioned from Otter Media's Consumer Division to Crunchyroll's Moldovan offices, and VRV became a brand of Crunchyroll. Ellation was later renamed to Crunchyroll Moldova on April 17, 2020.

On September 5, 2020, Crunchyroll announced that they had entered in a partnership with Sentai Filmworks to distribute Crunchyroll licensed titles onto home video and electronic sell-through, with Granbelm, Food Wars!: Shokugeki no Soma: The Fourth Plate, Ascendance of a Bookworm, and World Trigger being the first titles distributed through the partnership.

Acquisition by Sony
On August 12, 2020, The Information reported that Sony Pictures Entertainment, Funimation's parent company, was in talks to acquire Crunchyroll from WarnerMedia (later spun out by AT&T and merged with Discovery, Inc. to form Warner Bros.

The acquisition was considered to be a major consolidation of global anime distribution rights outside of East Asia. However, on March 24, 2021, it was reported that the United States Department of Justice had extended its antitrust review of the acquisition. 

On August 9, 2021, Sony announced that it had completed its acquisition of Crunchyroll. Following the acquisition, Sony stated that they wanted to create a unified anime subscription experience using their existing anime businesses as soon as possible. Crunchyroll confirmed four days later that VRV was included in the acquisition.

On September 23, 2021, Crunchyroll announced that they had entered in a partnership deal with Fuji TV for anime content development and production. The partners plan to start work on the new slate in April 2022 with anime-focused developer and producer Slow Curve.

On March 1, 2022, it was announced that the Funimation, Wakanim and VRV SVOD services would be consolidated into Crunchyroll. Additionally, Funimation Global Group, LLC will be renamed and merged into Crunchyroll, LLC, with the Funimation brand currently in the process of being phased out in favor of Crunchyroll. On that same day, March 13, Crunchyroll will start adding new anime titles, including Hindi or Indian English subs and dubs for India.

In the wake of the Russian military invasion of Ukraine, Crunchyroll and Wakanim announced that they would suspend their services in Russia as of March 11. Its parent company Sony donated $2 million in humanitarian aid to Ukraine.

On March 16, 2022, it was announced that Funimation's home video releases would be distributed under the Crunchyroll banner, with the latter's logo replacing that of the former on the spine and back of the covers for each new release that comes out starting with its June 2022 slate.

On March 24, 2022, Crunchyroll announced that starting with the Spring 2022 season, a subscription would be required to watch new and continued simulcast, with older titles featured on the site prior to this season remaining free to watch. It was also announced that the first three episodes of select titles would be free a week after their premiere until May 31.

On April 5, 2022, the company announced that Funimation's YouTube channel was rebranded as Crunchyroll Dubs and that it would serve as Crunchyroll's channel for English-dubbed content while English-subtitled content would still be uploaded on their Crunchyroll Collection channel. The company also stated that they would release an English-dubbed first episode of an anime series every Saturday at 3:00pm ET on the Crunchyroll Dubs YouTube channel, starting with Re:Zero − Starting Life in Another World on April 9, 2022. Three days later, another announcement was made in that the Funimation Shop would be moved to the Crunchyroll Store.

Availability

Device support
Crunchyroll is available worldwide (except for various Asian territories, including Japan) and can be accessed via an internet browser on PCs, while Crunchyroll apps are available on various platforms, including Blu-ray discs, mobile devices such as iOS/iPadOS, Android and Windows Phone, game consoles such as Xbox (Xbox 360, Xbox One and Xbox Series X|S), PlayStation (PlayStation 3/4/5 and PlayStation Vita) and Nintendo (Wii U and Nintendo Switch). It is also compatible with Windows and macOS operating systems for desktop and laptop devices. It is also available on Smart TVs made by Samsung and Sony, as well as available for media players like Apple TV, Roku, Google Chromecast, Amazon Fire TV, Tizen OS and Android TV on both TVs and external players like the Xiaomi Mi Box S and the Nvidia Shield TV, among others. The availability of the contents is through Premium payment plans as well as free of charge, with announcements and availability restrictions.

Operation
Crunchyroll is partly supported by advertising (freemium), where a user can have access to limited content with in return advertisements shown during the video. The service also offers subscriptions allowing the distribution without advertising of its catalog and early access to episodes of new series simulcast with Japan (free users having to wait a week). Originally, Crunchyroll presented two "Premium" and "Premium+" subscriptions, the differences of which lay with additional advantages in customer service. In August 2020, the service reorganized its subscriptions into three offers: "Fan", "Mega Fan", and "Ultimate Fan"; the Fan level corresponds to the previous Premium, the Mega Fan adds offline mode and simultaneous viewing to 4 devices, while the Ultimate Fan level (available only in English-speaking countries) extends viewing to 6 devices and includes other advantages in customer service.

Being a platform where the contents are broadcast mainly in video, the site was characterized for continued use of the obsolete Adobe Flash player in recent years. In September 2018 the platform was updated to an HTML5 viewer.

The Anime Awards

The Crunchyroll Anime Awards are annual awards given to recognize anime from the previous year. The awards were first held in January 2017 and returned for 2018. Crunchyroll selects twenty judges from diverse backgrounds who then create a list of six nominees within each category. This list is then made available to the public for online voting to choose the winners.

Crunchyroll Expo

In February 2017, Crunchyroll created the Crunchyroll Expo (CRX) anime convention with organizational support from Left Field Media. The inaugural Expo was held at the Santa Clara Convention Center on August 25–27, with team manager Dallas Middaugh noting much of the ticket sales came within ten days of the convention. Special guests for the Expo included The Fairly OddParents creator Butch Hartman, voice actors Shun Horie and Hiromi Igarashi, illustrator Yoshitaka Amano, figure skater Johnny Weir, manga artist Kore Yamazaki, and author Keiichi Sigsawa.

The Expo was moved to the San Jose McEnery Convention Center in 2018 on Labor Day weekend. The convention saw 45,000 in turnstile attendance. Among the guests for the convention were Dragon Quest creator Yuji Horii, voice actors Ryo Horikawa, Justin Briner, Luci Christian, Clifford Chapin and Colleen Clinkenbeard, and the staff of Darling in the Franxx.

Crunchyroll Expo 2019, also in San Jose, saw the premieres of the movie Blackfox and the Mob Psycho 100 II original video animation, while Toei Animation organized a screening of the movies Dragon Ball Z: Bardock – The Father of Goku and Dragon Ball Z: Fusion Reborn. Among the guests invited were horror mangaka Junji Ito; 22/7 voice actors Sally Amaki, Kanae Shirosawa, and Ruri Umino; Food Wars!: Shokugeki no Soma writer Yūto Tsukuda and artist Shun Saeki; and staff members of Zombie Land Saga, including voice actors Kaede Hondo and Asami Tano, composer Yasuharu Takanashi, and MAPPA CEO Manabu Ohtsuka. Rock band Flow, whose songs have been featured in various anime as opening themes, held a concert on August 30.

In 2020, Crunchyroll held its first virtual expo due to the COVID-19 pandemic. The event includes Hime's Cosplay Cup on September 5, 2020. Special guests included Shusuke Katagiri, Myth & Roid, Rian Tachibana, and Matt Schley.

In 2022, Crunchyroll Expo opened its new music festival, as well as featuring Hololive Production VTubers (including Hakos Baelz, Kureiji Ollie, Watson Amelia, Gawr Gura, Ninomae Ina'nis, and Takanashi Kiara) for the 2022 convention. At that same year, Crunchyroll held the event in Melbourne, Australia on September 17–18. The event had queueing and capacity issues.

On February 2nd, 2023, 6 months after announcing the dates and location, Crunchyroll revealed that its 2023 flagship event in San Jose would be cancelled in an effort to "focus on attending a growing roster of expos and festivals around the world."

Crunchyroll Originals
On February 25, 2020, Crunchyroll initially announced seven series under its Crunchyroll Originals label. These are anime or other animated series that are either co-produced or directly produced by the company. Crunchyroll previously co-produced anime titles before, but this list will only include those that Crunchyroll themselves officially place under the label.

So far, these series include:

See also
 List of anime releases made concurrently in the United States and Japan

References

External links

 
 

 
2006 establishments in California
2018 mergers and acquisitions
2021 mergers and acquisitions
Advertising video on demand
American companies established in 2006
Anime and manga websites
Anime companies
Aniplex
Companies based in Culver City, California
Former AT&T subsidiaries
Internet properties established in 2006
Mass media companies established in 2006
PlayStation 4 software
PlayStation 5 software
Sony subsidiaries
Subscription video on demand services
Universal Windows Platform apps
Xbox One software